Radio Gaga is a comic strip created by the Norwegian humourist "Flis" (Øyvind Sagåsen).

The series started in 2001, and is about characters who run a local radio station called Radio Gaga. Although the action takes place in the radio environment, it is mostly about the somewhat eccentric characters, and not so much about radio. Since 2008 it was published in the Pondus magazine, and in the newspapers Aftenposten  and Nordlys, as well as in a number of smaller publications.

References

External links 
 
 Radio Gaga webcomic
 Radio Gaga on Facebook
 Radio Gaga on Tapastic

Norwegian comic strips
2001 comics debuts
Humor comics
Gag-a-day comics
Webtoons
Tapastic webcomics
Fictional radio personalities
Fictional Norwegian people
Fictional radio stations
2001 establishments in Norway